The 2021 season will be Wigan Warriors's 41st consecutive season playing in England's top division of rugby league. During the season, they will compete in the Super League XXVI and the 2021 Challenge Cup.

Preseason  friendlies

On 4 March, Wigan announced a pre-season friendly against Salford Red Devils ahead of the delay start to the Super League.

Super League

Regular season
The start of the 2021 Super League season, which ordinarily would have started in late January, was delayed to March due to the continuation of the COVID-19 pandemic. On 11 February it was confirmed that match week one would commence on Friday 26 March, with Wigan Warriors facing newly promoted local rivals Leigh Centurions in the second fixture of the round. The full fixture list was announced on 26 February.

Matches

  

All fixtures are subject to change

League table

Play-offs

Challenge Cup

Transfers

Gains

Losses

Squad

Notes

References

Wigan Warriors seasons
Super League XXVI by club